This is a list of all the clubs playing in the Andorran football league system, under Federació Andorrana de Fútbol in the two amateur levels:

  Andorran First League (8 teams)
  Andorran Second League (15 teams)

The FC Andorra not play in Andorran leagues, but played in the Spanish leagues 

In bold are indicated eight teams winners Andorran First Division, Cup and Super Cup.

Andorra First Division

Andorran Second Division

Defunct Clubs

External links 
Weltfussball
National Football Teams

 
Andorra
Football clubs
Football clubs

ca:Llista de clubs de futbol d'Andorra